LASSBio-881 is a drug which acts as both a non-selective partial agonist of the CB1 and CB2 cannabinoid receptors, and also as an antagonist of the TRPV1 receptor, as well as having antioxidant effects. It has potent anti-inflammatory and anti-hyperalgesic effects in animal studies.

LASSBio-945 has an identical structure sans the nitro FG.

References 

Cannabinoids